= Sanjoy Banerjee =

American chemical engineer

Sanjoy Banerjee is an American chemical engineer, currently a Distinguished Professor at City College of New York and formerly Westinghouse Professor at McMaster University.

He is the director of the CUNY Energy Institute.
